The Rexed laminae comprise a system of ten layers of grey matter (I–X), identified in the early 1950s by Bror Rexed to label portions of the grey columns of the spinal cord.

Similar to Brodmann areas, they are defined by their cellular structure rather than by their location, but the location still remains reasonably consistent.

Laminae
 Posterior grey column: I–VI
 Lamina I: marginal nucleus of spinal cord or posteromarginal nucleus
 Lamina II: substantia gelatinosa of Rolando
 Laminae III and IV: nucleus proprius
 Lamina V: Neck of the dorsal horn. Neurons within lamina V are mainly involved in processing sensory afferent stimuli from cutaneous, muscle and joint mechanical nociceptors as well as visceral nociceptors. This layer is home to wide dynamic range tract neurons, interneurons and propriospinal neurons. Viscerosomatic pain signal convergence often occurs in this lamina due to the presence of wide dynamic range tract neurons resulting in pain referral.
 Lamina VI: Base of the dorsal horn. No nociceptive input occurs here, instead this lamina receives input from large-diameter fibres innervating muscles and joints and from muscle spindles which are sensitive to innocuous joint movement and muscle stretch to feed forward this information to the cerebellum where it can modulate muscle tone accordingly.
 Lateral grey column: VII and X
 Lamina VII:  intermediomedial nucleus, intermediolateral nucleus, posterior thoracic nucleus in the thoracic and upper lumbar region
 Lamina X: an area of grey matter surrounding the central canal.
 Anterior grey column: VIII–IX
 Lamina VIII: motor interneurons; Commissural nucleus
 Lamina IX: hypaxial (body wall muscles), lateral (in limb regions) and medial (back muscles) motor neurons, also phrenic and spinal accessory nuclei at cervical levels, and Onuf's nucleus in the sacral region

References 

Spinal cord